Few may refer to:

People 
 Bobby Few (1935–2021), an American musician
 Francis E. Walter, an American politician from Pennsylvania
 Ignatius Alphonso Few (1789–1845), an American preacher and academic, first president of Emory College (now Emory University)
 Mark Few (born 1962), an American basketball coach
 Robyn Few (1958–2012), an American rights activist
 William Few (1748–1828), an American founding father from Georgia
 William Preston Few (1867–1940), the first president of Duke University

Other uses 
 The Few, British aviators in the Battle of Britain
 Few (album), fifth studio album by rock band He is Legend
 Francis E. Walter Dam, a dam, recreational area, and disc golf course in Pennsylvania
 French Engineering Works, a South African tool manufacturer
 FEW, Französisches Etymologisches Wörterbuch (German: French Etymological Dictionary)

See also 
 Chosen Few (disambiguation)
 Quantity
 Fue (disambiguation)